The New Zealand topknot, Notoclinus fenestratus, is a triplefin of the genus Notoclinus, found around the North Island of New Zealand in reef areas of broken rock and brown seaweed.

References

 

 Tony Ayling & Geoffrey Cox, Collins Guide to the Sea Fishes of New Zealand,  (William Collins Publishers Ltd, Auckland, New Zealand 1982) 

Notoclinus
Endemic marine fish of New Zealand
Fish described in 1801